Hill's is a brand of Bohemian-style absinth owned and produced by the Czech company Hill's Liquere. Hill's Absinth was the first Czech absinth after the Velvet Revolution.

External links

Absinthes